Dendropanax morbiferus, also called Korean dendropanax, is a shrub native to the Korean peninsula, which belongs to the family Araliaceae.

References

Araliaceae